Jason Lunn (born September 19, 1974, in Boulder, Colorado) is a retired American middle-distance runner who mostly competed in the 1500 meters. He was the US outdoor champion at 1500m in 2003. He represented his country at one outdoor and three indoor World Championships.  He earned All-American honors for Stanford University in cross country in 1997, and multiple times in track and field. He is now an assistant professor at Penn State University.

Competition record

Personal bests
Outdoor
800 meters – 1:47.78 (Switzerland 2002)
1500 meters – 3:36.38 (Iráklio 2004)
Mile run – 3:54.43 (Eugene 2003)

Indoor
1500 meters – 3:40.42 (Lisbon 2001)
One mile – 3:55.49 (Fayetteville 2003)
3000 meters – 7:47.20 (Boston 2004)

References

USATF profile

1974 births
Living people
American male middle-distance runners
Sportspeople from Boulder, Colorado
World Athletics Championships athletes for the United States